The Megahertz Stakes is a Grade III American Thoroughbred horse race for fillies and mares that are four years old or older, over a distance of 1 mile on the turf held annually in January at Santa Anita Park, Arcadia, California.  The event currently carries a purse of $100,000.

History 
The race was inaugurated in 2011 and the event was run over the 1 mile distance.

The event is named in honor of the British mare Megahertz (GB) who was trained by the National Museum of Racing and Hall of Fame trainer Robert J. Frankel. Megahertz won two Grade I events including the 2005 Yellow Ribbon Stakes which was run at Santa Anita Park and the GII Santa Barbara Handicap twice (2003–2004).

In 2016 the event was upgraded to a Grade III event.

Records
Speed record: 
 1 mile  – 1:33.09  - A Jealous Woman (2013)

Margins: 
   lengths –  (2012)

Most wins by a trainer
 2 – John Shirreffs  (2016, 2020)
 2 – Neil D. Drysdale  (2012, 2018)

Winners

References

Graded stakes races in the United States
Grade 3 stakes races in the United States
Recurring sporting events established in 2015
2015 establishments in California
Turf races in the United States
Horse races in California
Mile category horse races for fillies and mares
Flat horse races for four-year-old fillies
Santa Anita Park